Eilean Ceann na Creige is a small island near Kennacraig in West Loch Tarbert in Scotland. Ceann na Creige is Gaelic for head of the rock.

Eilean Ceann na Creige is connected to Kennacraig by a causeway. It is the mainland terminal of the ferry to Islay, Jura and Colonsay.

Gallery

See also
 Kintyre Peninsula

Footnotes

Uninhabited islands of Argyll and Bute